Acetylglycinamide chloral hydrate is a hypnotic/sedative.  It is a combination of acetylglycinamide and chloral hydrate.

References

Sedatives
Combination drugs
GABAA receptor positive allosteric modulators